Feralia februalis is a species of moth of the family Noctuidae. It is found in the dry woodlands of the Pacific West of North America.

The wingspan is about 34 mm. Adults are on wing from late winter to early spring.

The larvae feed on the foliage of Quercus species.

External links
 Bug Guide
 Images

Psaphidinae
Moths described in 1874